NASCAR Heat 2002, sometimes mislabeled as NASCAR Heat, is a NASCAR video game produced by Infogrames for the Xbox, PlayStation 2, and Game Boy Advance consoles. It is the successor to the NASCAR Heat game, and the predecessor to NASCAR: Dirt to Daytona. NASCAR Heat 2002 can have 24 racers (PS2) and 43 (Xbox, including fictional cars) released on June 18, 2001 on the PS2, and has 19 official NASCAR tracks. The Xbox version was released on November 15, 2001 and the Game Boy Advance version was released on May 6, 2002.

Development
The game was supported by GameSpy Arcade for online multiplayer.

Reception

The PlayStation 2 and Xbox versions received "favorable" reviews, while the Game Boy Advance version received "mixed" reviews, according to the review aggregation website Metacritic. Jim Preston of NextGens September 2001 issue said that the PS2 version "lacks the complete details to be the best, but it's still an accurate and fun way to drive fast and to the left." Three issues later, however, he said that the Xbox version "won't convert non-NASCAR nuts, but casual and hardcore stock fans would be wise to pick it up."

References

External links
 

2001 video games
Game Boy Advance games
Infogrames games
NASCAR video games
PlayStation 2 games
Video games developed in the United States
Xbox games
Crawfish Interactive games
Monster Games games